Ramudu Bheemudu is a 1988 Telugu-language drama film, produced by CHVV Satyanarayana under the Satyam Cine Enterprises banner and directed by K. Murali Mohana Rao. Starring Nandamuri Balakrishna, Radha, Suhasini and music composed by Chakravarthy.

Plot
The film begins with Bhimudu a night watch at Hindupur who is admired by everyone therein and resides with his grandmother Yashodamma and sister Kavita. He stands for piety and pillars his bestie Sagar the MLA of the constitution. Plus, counteracts the enormities of barbaric Tata Rao an opposition leader, and his son Papa Rao. Besides, Ramudu a callow is identical to Bhimudu spends his life jolly, and is the only heir of business tycoon Rajashekaram. Suyodhana Rao is a sly & brutish brother of Ramudu's mother Parvati that is waiting for a spot to usurp his wealth by knitting his daughter Surpanaka with Ramudu. Tata Rao & Suyodhana Rao are partners in traffic in arms who are unbeknownst to Ramudu & Bhimudu alike. Swati a benevolent secretary of Rajashekaram lives with her father Satyam & aunt Savitri. Ramudu falls for her at first sight itself, therefore, he proceeds to the office on the pretext of meeting her. After a while, she too darlings and transforms him a lot which envies Suyodhana Rao. Bhimudu always squabbles with a plucky Manga and they crush.

Presently, the government announces lands for the destitute which Tata Rao acts together to squat. Sagar with aid of Bhimudu bars and successfully allocates the lands to the original. Begrudged Tata Rao intrigues and mingles Sagar when Bhimudu enrages and the rift arises. At the same time, Bhimudu learns Kavita & Sagar's younger Raju are turtle doves which he defies. So, they silently wedlock when Bhimudu quits her. Apart from that, Suyodhana Rao knowledges Ramudu's love affair and endangers Swati. Whereupon, Ramudu affirms to espouse Swati when Suyodhana Rao schemes by stating that Surpanaka is conceived by Ramudu. Swati also misconstrues him, exits the town, and reaches Sagar. Now Rajashekaram forcibly attempts to nuptial Ramudu. As a result, he absconds and lands at Hindupur for the whereabouts of Swati. Simultaneously, Tata Rao ploys to murder Bhimudu but unfortunately, they affront Ramudu. Anyhow, Bhimudu guards him, and both encounter each other. Soon after, Yashodhamma declares that the progeny of a single father spins rearwards.

Once, pregnant Savitri non-else Swathi's aunt gazes at the illegal acts of Suyodhana Rao their manager in those days. Satyam the trustworthy driver of Rajashekaram secures and shelters her. Promptly, Suyodhana Rao falsifies their elopement to Rajashekaram and instantly arranges his alliance with Parvati. Satyam & Savitri rushes to be stopped but they had a stroke of Suyodhana Rao and are admitted to a hospital. In that place, Savitri delivers Bhimudu, and Yashodamma is a nurse. Shortly, Suyodhana Rao gives one more hit, and they all split. As of today, Ramudu & Bhimudu joins to crack down on Suyodhana Rao. In the interim, Sagar is backstabbed by Tata Rao who admits fault and reconciles with Bhimudu. Before long, Bhimudu detects Savitri via Yashodamma and Swati comprehends Ramudu's virtue.

At this point, Ramudu & Bhimudu swaps when Bhimudu exposes Surpanaka's bogus charge with the aid of Manga. He confirms the real killer as Papa Rao and splices them. Nowadays, Ramudu turns into a valiant training of Swati. Next, Suyodhana Rao & Tata Rao cabal assassinated Sagar to incriminate Bhimudu but unfortunately, Ramudu is prisoned. Subsequently, Suyodhana Rao discovers the selfsameness of Ramudu & Bhimudu and the existence of Savitri when he informs regarding happening to the original Bhimudu. During the judicial proceedings, he arrives to protect his sibling when the two confuse all. Meanwhile, the brutal onslaughts and abducts the entire family. Here, Bhimudu brings out the diabolic shade of Suyodhana Rao and proves his mother's chastity. At last, Ramudu & Bhimudu ceases baddies when tragically Parvati dies entrusting Ramudu to Savitri. Finally, the movie ends on a happy note with the marriage of Ramudu to Swati & Bhimudu to Manga.

Cast

Nandamuri Balakrishna as Ramudu & Bheemudu (dual role)
Radha as Manga
Suhasini as Swathi
Rao Gopal Rao as Suyodhana Rao
Satyanarayana as Tata Rao
Jaggayya as Raja Shekaram
Sudhakar as Papa Rao
Jaya Bhaskar as MLA Sagar
Raj Varma
Ramji as Raju
Ram Jagan as Anji
Sakshi Ranga Rao as Govindaiah
Raavi Kondala Rao
Vankayala Satyanayana as Satyam
Bhimeswara Rao
Chalapathi Rao as Pothuraju
Chidatala Appa Rao as Chanti
Chitti Babu as Chitti
Annapurna as Savitri
Srividya as Parvathi
Malashri as Surpanaka
Varalakshmi as Kavitha
Nirmalamma as Yashodamma
KK Sarma
Potti Prasad
Dham
Modhukuri Satyam

Soundtrack

Music was composed by Chakravarthy, and lyrics were written by Veturi. Music was released by Cauvery Audio Company.

References

1988 films
1980s Telugu-language films
Indian drama films
Films scored by K. Chakravarthy
Twins in Indian films